Odomasta is a genus of spiders in the family Miturgidae. It was first described in 1909 by Simon. , it contains only one species, Odomasta guttipes, found in Tasmania.

References

Miturgidae
Monotypic Araneomorphae genera
Spiders of Australia